Volcan is a Peruvian mining company.

It was founded in 1943. Today, it is mostly engaged in the exploitation of silver, zinc, copper and lead, but also operates hydroelectric power plants.

References 

1943 establishments in Peru
Mining companies of Peru
Hydroelectricity in Peru
Hydroelectric power companies
Silver mining companies
Zinc mining companies
Copper mining companies
Lead mining companies